Samahil Municipality (Yucatec Maya: "place of the legume") is one of the 106 municipalities in the Mexican state of Yucatán containing (185.22 km2) of land and is located roughly  southwest of the city of Mérida.

History
There is no accurate data on when the town was founded, but it was a settlement before the conquest and was located in the chieftainship of Ak Canul. After colonization, the area became part of the encomienda system with various encomenderos. The first was Rodrigo Alvarez in 1549 and later, José Solís Osorio in 1704.

Yucatán declared its independence from the Spanish Crown in 1821 and in 1825 the area was assigned to the Lower Camino Real under the  Hunucma Municipality. In 1918 the area was confirmed as its own municipality.

Governance
The municipal president is elected for a three-year term. The town council has four councilpersons, who serve as Secretary and councilors of public lighting, heritage and patrimony, cemeteries and markets.

The Municipal Council administers the business of the municipality. It is responsible for budgeting and expenditures and producing all required reports for all branches of the municipal administration. Annually it determines educational standards for schools.

The Police Commissioners ensure public order and safety. They are tasked with enforcing regulations, distributing materials and administering rulings of general compliance issued by the council.

Communities
The head of the municipality is Samahil, Yucatán. The municipality has 13 other populated places including Dzit, Katua, Kuchel, Poot, San Antonio Tedzidz and Xkapul. The significant populations are shown below:

Local festivals
Every year on 9 June the town holds a celebration for their patron, San Pedro Abad.

Tourist attractions
 Former Convent of San Pedro, built in the colonial era 
 Hacienda San Antonio Tedzidz

References

Municipalities of Yucatán